A cactolith is "a quasi-horizontal chonolith composed of anastomosing ductoliths, whose distal ends curl like a harpolith, thin out like a sphenolith, or bulge discordantly like an akmolith or ethmolith".

The term was coined by Charles B. Hunt, a USGS researcher, in his paper "Geology and geography of the Henry Mountains region, Utah" (1953). He was in fact describing an actual geological feature—a laccolith which he saw as resembling a cactus—he was also, tongue-in-cheek, commenting on what he saw as an absurd number of "-lith" words in the field of geology.

References

Igneous petrology
Satire